Ju Wen-bin (born on 5 July 1969) is a Taiwanese football player and manager.

As a player, Ju plays for Tatung F.C. as a defender and was voted as one of the best center backs at the 2005 league season. He was also the former skipper of Chinese Taipei national football team.

As a manager, Ju has managed Kuang Fu Junior High School of Hualien and Chinese Taipei women's national under-17 football team. He is the current head coach of women's football team of Hualien Physical Experimental Education Senior High School.

References

1969 births
Living people
Taiwanese football managers
Taiwanese footballers
Tatung F.C. players
Chinese Taipei international footballers
Association football defenders